Grove is a rural locality in the local government area (LGA) of Huon Valley in the South-east region of Tasmania, Australia. The locality is 35 km southwest of Hobart and 7 km north-east of the town of Huonville. As a rural locality, there are no urban settlements in Grove. The 2016 census does not provide a population for the locality of Grove. It covers an area of approximately 30.8 km². The postcode for Grove is 7109.

The localities which adjoin Grove are Collinsvale, Crabtree, Mountain River, Lachlan, Longley, Lower Longley and Lucaston.

History
The first non-Aboriginal occupation of Grove was the farm property Grove Estate, by Silas Parsons in 1839.
Grove was gazetted as a locality in 1970.

Geography
Mountain River, a tributary of the Huon River, flows from north-east to south-west through the northern part of Grove, and then forms much of its western boundary. Most of the part of Grove southeast of the Huon Highway (12.7 km²) is hilly and remains forested, whereas most of the part northwest of the Huon Highway (18.1 km²) is undulating and cleared for agriculture - chiefly grazing and orchards. Huonville is the nearest service centre for Grove, which contains few facilities or services.

Road infrastructure 
The Huon Highway (route A6) enters from the north-east from the direction of Hobart and runs through Grove to the south-west, where it exits towards Huonville. It is the major road in Grove. Route C617 (Mountain River Road) starts at an intersection with A6 and runs northward through Grove until it exits, following the Mountain River. Route C618 (Crabtree Road) starts at an intersection with C617 and runs north-west until it exits Grove. Route C619 (Lollara Road) starts at an intersection with A6 and runs west until it exits, eventually following the left bank of the Huon River, then the right bank, downstream to Huonville.  Together these three roads form the basis of the road network in Grove. There are no railways in Grove.

References

External links
Huon Valley Area website

Localities of Huon Valley Council
Huon Valley
Towns in Tasmania